Gren is both a given name and a surname. As a given name it is often used as a short name of Grenville or Grenfell. It may refer to
Given name
Gren (Grenfell Jones, 1934–2007), Welsh newspaper cartoonist
Gren Alabaster (born 1933), New Zealand cricketer
Grenville Goodwin (c. 1898–1951), Canadian politician
Gren Jones (footballer) (1932–1991), English football player
Gren Wells, American filmmaker, screenwriter, and actor

Surname
Axel Wenner-Gren (1881–1961), Swedish entrepreneur
Friedrich Albrecht Carl Gren (1760–1798), German chemist 
Gunnar Gren (1920–1991), Swedish football player and coach
Hans Gren (born 1957), Swedish football manager
Martin Gren (born 1962), Swedish entrepreneur and inventor
Mats Gren (born 1963), Swedish football player and coach